Dujiangyan is a 1995 Chinese documentary film directed by Liu Lizhong. It won Huabiao Award for the Best Scientific Documentary film.

Plot
The film introduces the history and technology of the Dujiangyan irrigation system, discusses its influence on the economy of Sichuan and the culture of China.

References

External links

Chinese documentary films
1995 documentary films
1995 films